Frank Williams (23 May 1921 – 1999) was an English footballer who played as a winger for Halifax Town in the Football League.

Statistics
Source:

References

1921 births
1999 deaths
Footballers from Halifax, West Yorkshire
English footballers
Association football wingers
Halifax Town A.F.C. players
Bacup Borough F.C. players
English Football League players